Law French is an archaic language originally based on Old Norman and Anglo-Norman, but increasingly influenced by Parisian French and, later, English. It was used in the law courts of England, beginning with the Norman conquest of England in 1066. Its use continued for several centuries in the courts of England and Wales and Ireland.  Although Law French as a narrative legal language is obsolete, many individual Law French terms continue to be used by lawyers and judges in common law jurisdictions (see the section "Survivals in modern legal terminology", below).

History
The earliest known documents in which French (i.e. Anglo-Norman) is used for discourse on English law date from the third quarter of the thirteenth century and include two particular documents. The first is The Provisions of Oxford (1258), consisting of the terms of oaths sworn by the 24 magnates appointed to rectify abuses in the administration of King Henry III, together with summaries of their rulings. The second is The Casus Placitorum (c. 1250 – c. 1270), a collection of legal maxims, rules and brief narratives of cases.

In these works the language is already sophisticated and technical, well equipped with its own legal terminology. This includes many words which are of Latin origin but whose forms have been shortened or distorted in a way which suggests that they already possessed a long history of French usage. Some examples include advowson from the Latin advocationem, meaning the legal right to nominate a parish priest; neif[e], from the Latin nātīvā, meaning a female serf; and essoyne or essone from the Latin sunnis,  meaning a circumstance that provides exemption from a royal summons (later essonia replaced sunnis in Latin, thus replacing into Latin from the French form).

Until the early fourteenth century, Law French largely coincided with the French used as an everyday language by the upper classes. As such, it reflected some of the changes undergone by the northern dialects of mainland French during the period.  Thus, in the documents mentioned above, 'of the king' is rendered as del rey, whereas by about 1330 it had become du roi (as in modern French) or du roy.

During the 14th century vernacular French suffered a rapid decline in Western Europe Islands. The use of Law French was criticized by those who argued that lawyers sought to restrict entry into the legal profession. The Pleading in English Act 1362 ("Statute of Pleading") acknowledged this change by ordaining that thenceforward all court pleading must be in English so "every Man….may the better govern himself without offending of the Law." From that time, Law French lost most of its status as a spoken language.  It remained in use for the 'readings' (lectures) and 'moots' (academic debates), held in the Inns of Court as part of the education of young lawyers, but essentially it quickly became a written language alone; it ceased to acquire new words, its grammar degenerated (by about 1500, gender was often neglected, giving rise to such absurdities as une home ('a (feminine) man') or un feme ('a (masculine) woman'), and its vocabulary became increasingly English, as it was used solely by English, Welsh and Irish lawyers and judges who often spoke no real French.

In the seventeenth century, the moots and readings fell into neglect, and the rule of Oliver Cromwell, with its emphasis on removing the relics of archaic ritual from legal and governmental processes, struck a further blow at the language.  Even before then, in 1628, Sir Edward Coke acknowledged in his preface to the First Part of the Institutes of the Law of England that Law French had almost ceased to be a spoken tongue.  It was still used for case reports and legal textbooks until almost the end of the century, but only in an anglicized form. A frequently quoted example of this change comes from one of Chief Justice Sir George Treby's marginal notes in an annotated edition of Dyer's Reports, published 1688:

Only Proceedings in Courts of Justice Act 1730 made English (instead of Law French and Latin) the obligatory language for use in the courts of England and in the court of exchequer in Scotland. It was later extended to Wales, and seven years later a similar act was passed in Ireland, the Administration of Justice (Language) Act (Ireland) 1737.

Survivals in modern legal terminology
The postpositive adjectives in many legal noun phrases in English—attorney general, fee simple—are a heritage from Law French. Native speakers of French may not understand certain Law French terms not used in modern French or replaced by other terms.  For example, the current French word for "mortgage" is hypothèque. Many of the terms of Law French were converted into modern English in the 20th century to make the law more understandable in common-law jurisdictions. However, some key Law French terms remain, including the following:

See also

 French language
 Norman language
 French phrases used by English speakers
 English words of French origin
 Jersey Legal French
 Franglais
 List of legal Latin terms
 Legal English

Notes

References

Literature
 Manual of Law French by J. H. Baker, 1979.
 The Mastery of the French Language in England by B. Clover, 1888.
 "The salient features of the language of the earlier year books" in Year Books 10 Edward II, pp. xxx–xlii. M. D. Legge, 1934.
 "Of the Anglo-French Language in the Early Year Books" in Year Books 1 & 2 Edward II, pp. xxxiii–lxxxi. F. W. Maitland, 1903.
 The Anglo-Norman Dialect by L. E. Menger, 1904.
 From Latin to Modern French, with especial Consideration of Anglo-Norman by M. K. Pope, 1956.
 L'Evolution du Verbe en Anglo-Français, XIIe-XIVe Siècles by F. J. Tanquerey, 1915.

External links
 The Law-French Dictionary Alphabetically Digested. 1718.

English law
French dialects
 
Irish law
Legal history of England
Norman language